Dmitri Dmitrijev (born on 17 June 1982) is Estonian politician. He is member of XIV Riigikogu. Since 2005 he belongs to Estonian Centre Party.

Dmitrijev was born in Kiviõli. He graduated from the Kiviõli Russian Gymnasium in 2000, and from Tallinn University of Technology in 2005 with a degree in business administration. From 2007 until 2015 he was the mayor of Kiviõli.

He has been member of XIII Riigikogu.

References

1982 births
Estonian Centre Party politicians
Estonian people of Russian descent
Living people
Mayors of places in Estonia
Members of the Riigikogu, 2015–2019
Members of the Riigikogu, 2019–2023
People from Kiviõli